Halecroft is a Grade II* listed building in Hale, Greater Manchester. The building was designed by architect Edgar Wood and was built in 1890; it is an example of Wood's work influenced by the Arts and Crafts Movement. It is one of 11 Grade II* listed buildings in Trafford. Halecroft is two storeys high with a one-storey 20th century extension.

See also

Grade II* listed buildings in Greater Manchester
Listed buildings in Hale, Greater Manchester

References

Grade II* listed buildings in Greater Manchester
Buildings and structures in Trafford
Buildings and structures completed in 1890